Undulambia semilunalis is a moth in the family Crambidae. It was described by George Hampson in 1897 and it is found in Brazil.

References

Moths described in 1897
Musotiminae